Peebles and Selkirk was a county constituency of the House of Commons of the Parliament of the United Kingdom (Westminster) from 1868 to 1918. It elected one Member of Parliament (MP) by the first past the post voting system.

Boundaries 

The name relates the constituency to the counties of Peebles and Selkirk.

From 1708 to 1868 the counties had been covered, at least nominally, by the Peeblesshire and Selkirkshire constituencies.

When the Peebles and Selkirk constituency was abolished in 1918, the Peebles and Southern Midlothian and Roxburgh and Selkirk constituencies were created.

Members of Parliament

Elections

Elections in the 1860s

Elections in the 1870s

Elections in the 1880s

Elections in the 1890s

Elections in the 1900s

Elections in the 1910s 

General Election 1914–15:

Another General Election was required to take place before the end of 1915. The political parties had been making preparations for an election to take place and by the July 1914, the following candidates had been selected; 
Liberal: Donald Maclean
Unionist: John Buchan

References 

Historic parliamentary constituencies in Scotland (Westminster)
Peeblesshire
Selkirkshire
Constituencies of the Parliament of the United Kingdom disestablished in 1918
Constituencies of the Parliament of the United Kingdom established in 1868